Sandusky is an unincorporated community in Clinton Township, Decatur County, Indiana.

History
Sandusky was laid out 1882 along the railroad that was built through it. It was likely named after Sandusky, Ohio. A post office was established at Sandusky in 1882, and remained in operation until it was discontinued in 1905.

References

Unincorporated communities in Decatur County, Indiana
Unincorporated communities in Indiana
1882 establishments in Indiana